Põlva Serviti is an Estonian handball team from Põlva. They compete in Meistriliiga and Baltic Handball League.

Crest, colours, supporters

Kits

Accomplishments

Baltic Handball League: 
Winners (1) : 2010
Runner-Up (3) : 2011, 2012, 2014
Meistriliiga: 
Winners (11) : 1998, 2000, 2001, 2002, 2007, 2008, 2010, 2011, 2013, 2015, 2016,2017,2018,2019
Runner-Up (7) : 1993, 1994, 1999, 2003, 2004, 2012, 2014

European record

Current squad 

Squad for the 2020-21 season 

Goalkeepers
 Jürgen Lepasson
 Christofer Viilop
 Eston Varusk

Wingers
RW
  Kristjan Muuga 
  Sander Sarapuu
LW 
  Henri Sillaste
  Mathias Rebane
  Siivo Sokk
Line players 
  Arturs Meikšans
  	Ülljo Pihus
  Indrek Neeme

Back players
LB
  Henri Hiiend 
  Alfred Timmo
  Carl-Eric Uibo
CB 
  Anatoli Chezlov
  Tõnis Kase 
  Raiko Rudissaar 
  Mario Karuse
RB
  Andris Celminš
  Otto Karl kont
  Markel Veiko

References

External links

Team page at eurohandball.com

Põlva Serviti
Põlva Parish